The North Shore Times is an Australian local newspaper, serving the local government areas of Willoughby, Ku-ring-gai, Lane Cove and part of North Sydney.

Like the Northern District Times, the paper is one of News Limited's community newspapers in New South Wales. It is delivered free to homes and businesses every Thursday as of July 2016 after originally being a Wednesday and Friday publication. The Wednesday publication of The North Shore Times was established in 1960 and the Friday publication was established in 1989.

Readership
At present, the circulation of both the Wednesday and Friday publications of the North Shore Times reaches approximately 75,000 homes and businesses, with the estimated total number of people who read the newspaper being around 112,000. The majority of North Shore Times' readers are in the 35–49 and 50–64 age groups.

See also 
 List of newspapers in Australia

References

External links 
 North Shore Times website
 News Community Media

Newspapers published in Sydney
News Corp Australia
1960 establishments in Australia